Furze is a common name for Ulex, a genus of about 20 species of evergreen shrubs in the subfamily Faboideae of the pea family Fabaceae.

Furze may also refer to:
 Colin Furze (1979-), plumber, stuntman, filmmaker, inventor and two-time Guinness World Record holder
 Mark Furze (born 1986), Australian actor
 The Furze, a British indie band

See also
 Furs